A Growling Place is a picture book written and illustrated by Thomas Aquinas Maguire, published on August 28, 2007, by Simply Read Books in Vancouver, British Columbia.

Description
The story of a young girl named Aril is told primarily with long horizontal images and few words. Though it is a picture book, A Growling Place makes use of chapters - each chapter name is a simple concept in the progression of the story and is highlighted in the sentence in which it appears.

Awards
2nd place - 26th Annual Awards for Excellence in Book Design in Canada by the Alcuin Society. April 11, 2008

External links
Official website
Author's website
CCBC Article on Alcuin Awards
Alcuin Society webpage
Magazine Review
Simply Read Books

Canadian children's books
Canadian picture books
2007 children's books